Simon Raab is an American contemporary artist, entrepreneur, inventor and scientist.

Early life and education
Simon Raab was born in Toulouse, France in 1952. He was raised in Canada and immigrated to the United States in 1990. He holds a Ph.D. in Mechanical Engineering from McGill University, Montreal, Canada, a Masters of Engineering Physics (Surface Physics) from Cornell University, USA, and a Bachelor of Science in Physics from the University of Waterloo, Canada.

Raab lives and works in Santa Barbara, California.

Scientific career
Raab is the co-founder of Faro Technologies where he remains chairman of the board. He served as chief executive officer of the company from its inception in 1982 until January 2006, and is presently in that role again, after resuming the position in November 2015.  Raab holds more than 80 US patents with associated foreign patents in fields of 3D coordinate measuring systems, bio-materials, medical diagnostics and computerized surgical assistance.  He is currently the Chairman of LunglifeAI focusing on diagnostic tests for early lung cancer and serves as Co-Chairman of TrueDigital Surgical, Inc developing the first digital 3D surgical microscopes and robotic guidance systems.

Artist

Raab comes from a family involved in creative enterprises. His mother was a landscape artist and an acquaintance of Frederick Varley (1881–1969) from Canada's Group of Seven. Raab's uncle, Ernest Raab was a sculptor of Jewish art and created bronze sculptures and glass altars for synagogues and memorial sites, such as the Holocaust Memorial in Earl Bales Park Toronto, Canada.  Raab's aunts were fashion designers and his father Alexandre, was a rose hybridizer and the author of "The Manifesto of Entrepreneurial Democracies".

As a scientist and engineer, Raab claims to bring his technical training in materials to bear on his art:

"My art is the result of my many years working in science and physics, encompassing a career focused on 3D measurement devices. [...] Parleau is about realizations. I realize that when I try to control, I control less. I realize that every time I try to color inside the lines that the color leaks out. I realize that understanding begins by admitting I don't understand. In physics, the uncertainty principle embodies the resistance to precision. The art begins formalized, boundary-delimited and planar, and then begins to quickly escape and deform and seek other dimensions."

Parleau
Raab works in a new medium, he calls and patented as "Parleau" ("Parleaux" in the plural) which is French for 'through the water'. The term suggests the quality of light passing through liquid. He uses large-format sheets of metal (aluminum or stainless steel) which he paints first and then forms and sculpts by hand. He creates wall-mounted paintings with embedded frames and freestanding volumetric sculptures.

Exhibitions

Solo exhibitions (selection)

"Pull the Pin", Mannheim, Germany, 2012/2013
"Crushed", Toronto, Canada, 2012
"Vibrations", Dresden, Germany, 2012
"Dichtung und Wahrheit", Frankfurt am Main, Germany, 2012
"Surface Tension", Seoul, South Korea, 2012
"Parleau 2007–2011", Munich, Germany, 2011
"From Behind These Bars", Mannheim, Germany, 2011
"Complexhibition", Mannheim, Germany, 2011
"From Behind These Bars", Vienna, Austria, 2011
"Attraverso l'acqua - Parleau", Massa, Italy, 2010/2011
"What comes together must come apart", Amsterdam, The Netherlands, 2010
"Attraverso l'acqua - Parleau", Lucca, Italy, 2010
"Also too late for shame", Mannheim, Germany, 2010
"The Sun Does Set", London, UK, 2010
"New Objects - Parleau", Mannheim, Germany, 2009

Selected bibliography

Exhibition catalogs and monographs

Simon Raab - Vibrations. Exhibition catalog: Kunsthalle Dresden (publisher), with contributions by Dirk Gädeke and Michael Schultz, 2012, 
Simon Raab - From Behind These Bars. Exhibition catalog: Vienna Künstlerhaus and Mannheimer Kunstverein, Verlag für moderne Kunst Nürnberg (publisher), with contributions by Peter Bogner, Martin Stather and Milan Chlumsky, 2011, 
Simon Raab - Parleau - Attraverso l'acqua. Exhibition catalog: Chiesa di San Matteo/Lucca and Palazzo Ducale Massa, Italy, with contributions by Maurizio Vanni and Alessandro Romanini, Claudio Poleschi Art Contemporanea (publisher), 2010
Simon Raab - Parleau. Monograph with contributions by Gerard Haggerty, Ulrike Lorenz, Martin Stather and Carsten Ahrens, Galerie Peter Zimmermann (publisher), 2010, 
Simon Raab - Parleau. Exhibition catalog: Galerie Peter Zimmermann, with a contribution by Gerard Haggerty, 2009

Articles

Michael J. Kaufman, "A new Patent issued for an Art Form. The Artist/Inventor turns his back on a $2 Billion Art Factory", Gnome Magazine, June 2013
Milan Chlumsky,  “Die Kunst ist eine Granate“, Rhein-Neckar-Zeitung, December 2012
“Surface Tension“, Culture Ocean, March 2012
Rüdiger Heise, “Der kreative Zerstörer“, Applaus Kultur-Magazine, November 2011
Michael J. Kaufman , “Talking Trademark - Interview with Simon Raab“, NY Arts Magazine, August 2011

References

External links
Official website

1952 births
20th-century American businesspeople
21st-century American businesspeople
20th-century American painters
American male painters
21st-century American painters
21st-century American male artists
American inventors
American mechanical engineers
Businesspeople from California
Cornell University alumni
Date of birth missing (living people)
Living people
McGill University Faculty of Engineering alumni
Painters from California
People from Santa Barbara, California
University of Waterloo alumni
French emigrants to Canada
Canadian emigrants to the United States
20th-century American sculptors
20th-century American male artists
American male sculptors
Sculptors from California
Engineers from California